Shawn Corbin (born 21 February 1975) is a Trinidadian professional boxer, competing in the Cruiserweight weight class.

Professional career
On January 30, 2010, Corbin fought Karo Murat for the WBO Inter-Continental Light Heavyweight title, but lost by second-round technical knockout.

On April 13, 2013, Corbin fought Mateusz Masternak for the vacant WBC International Silver Cruiserweight title, but lost by ninth-round technical knockout.

On May 17, 2014, Corbin fought Nathan Cleverly for the vacant WBA Inter-Continental Cruiserweight title, but lost by second-round technical knockout.

Professional boxing record 

| style="text-align:center;" colspan="8"|17 Wins (12 knockouts, 4 decisions, 1 disqualification),  5 Losses, 0 Draws
|-  style="text-align:center; background:#e3e3e3;"
|  style="border-style:none none solid solid; "|Res.
|  style="border-style:none none solid solid; "|Record
|  style="border-style:none none solid solid; "|Opponent
|  style="border-style:none none solid solid; "|Type
|  style="border-style:none none solid solid; "|Rd., Time
|  style="border-style:none none solid solid; "|Date
|  style="border-style:none none solid solid; "|Location
|  style="border-style:none none solid solid; "|Notes
|- align=center
|Loss
|align=center|17–5||align=left| Nathan Cleverly
|
|
|
|align=left|
|align=left|
|- align=center
|Win
|align=center|17–4||align=left| Anthony Augustin
|
|
|
|align=left|
|align=left|
|- align=center
|Win
|align=center|16–4||align=left| Kenneth Bishop
|
|
|
|align=left|
|align=left|
|- align=center
|Loss
|align=center|15–4||align=left| Mateusz Masternak
|
|
|
|align=left|
|align=left|
|- align=center
|Win
|align=center|15–3||align=left| Wayne Braithwaite
|
|
|
|align=left|
|align=left|
|- align=center
|Loss
|align=center|14–3||align=left| Dawid Kostecki
|
|
|
|align=left|
|align=left|
|- align=center
|Win
|align=center|14–2||align=left| Cleveland Fraser
|
|
|
|align=left|
|align=left|
|- align=center
|Loss
|align=center|13–2||align=left| Karo Murat
|
|
|
|align=left|
|align=left|
|- align=center
|Win
|align=center|13–1||align=left| Curtis Murray
|
|
|
|align=left|
|align=left|
|- align=center
|Win
|align=center|12–1||align=left| Theophilus King
|
|
|
|align=left|
|align=left|
|- align=center
|Win
|align=center|11–1||align=left| Leon Gilkes
|
|
|
|align=left|
|align=left|
|- align=center
|Win
|align=center|10–1||align=left| Tomas Orozco Rodriguez
|
|
|
|align=left|
|align=left|
|- align=center
|Win
|align=center|9–1||align=left| Leon Gilkes
|
|
|
|align=left|
|align=left|
|- align=center
|Loss
|align=center|8–1||align=left| Tito Mendoza
|
|
|
|align=left|
|align=left|
|- align=center
|Win
|align=center|8–0||align=left| John Monroy
|
|
|
|align=left|
|align=left|
|- align=center
|Win
|align=center|7–0||align=left| Julian Tannis
|
|
|
|align=left|
|align=left|
|- align=center
|Win
|align=center|6–0||align=left| Antonio Mercado
|
|
|
|align=left|
|align=left|
|- align=center
|Win
|align=center|5–0||align=left| Julian Tannis
|
|
|
|align=left|
|align=left|
|- align=center
|Win
|align=center|4–0||align=left|Trevor Greaves
|
|
|
|align=left|
|align=left|
|- align=center
|Win
|align=center|3–0||align=left| John Monroy
|
|
|
|align=left|
|align=left|
|- align=center
|Win
|align=center|2–0||align=left| Jameson Bostic
|
|
|
|align=left|
|align=left|
|- align=center
|Win
|align=center|1–0||align=left| Ricardo Innes
|
|
|
|align=left|
|align=left|

References

1975 births
Living people
Trinidad and Tobago male boxers
Light-heavyweight boxers
Cruiserweight boxers